is a gate at Tokyo Imperial Palace, in Tokyo, Japan. It was the location of the Sakuradamon Incident in 1860.

Opposite the gate of Sakurada Gate is the headquarters of the Tokyo Metropolitan Police Department, which shares "Sakurada Gate" as a metonym (akin to London's Scotland Yard).

Access
 Sakuradamon Station (Yūrakuchō Line)
 Kasumigaseki Station (Marunouchi, Hibiya, and Chiyoda lines)

References

External links

 Soto Sakurada-mon Gate at Chyoda Ward Turism's official website (English)

Gates in Japan
Tokyo Imperial Palace